Mechthild Heil ( Rumpf, born 23 August 1961) is a German architect and politician of the Christian Democratic Union (CDU) who has been serving as a member of the Bundestag from the state of Rhineland-Palatinate since 2009.

Political career 
Heil first became a member of the Bundestag in the 2009 German federal election. She served on the Committee on Labour and Social Affairs (2009-2010) and the Sports Committee (2009-2013) before moving to the Committee on Legal Affairs and Consumer Protection 2013. 

In the negotiations to form a Grand Coalition of the Christian Democrats (CDU together with the Bavarian CSU) and the SPD under the leadership of Chancellor Angela Merkel following the 2013 elections, Heil was part of the CDU/CSU delegation in the working group on the environment and agriculture, led by Katherina Reiche and Ute Vogt. In similar negotiations following the 2017 federal elections, she was part of the working group on internal and legal affairs, led by Thomas de Maizière, Stephan Mayer and Heiko Maas. From 2018 to 2021, she chaired the Committee on Building, Housing, Urban Development and Local Government.

Other activities 
 Federal Agency for Civic Education (BPB), Member of the Board of Trustees
 Kreissparkasse Mayen, Member of the Supervisory Board

Political positions 
In June 2017, Heil voted against her parliamentary group’s majority and in favor of Germany's introduction of same-sex marriage.

References

External links 

  
 Bundestag biography 

1961 births
Living people
Members of the Bundestag for Rhineland-Palatinate
Female members of the Bundestag
21st-century German women politicians
Members of the Bundestag 2021–2025
Members of the Bundestag 2017–2021
Members of the Bundestag 2013–2017
Members of the Bundestag 2009–2013
Members of the Bundestag for the Christian Democratic Union of Germany
Recipients of the Cross of the Order of Merit of the Federal Republic of Germany